Roger P Roberts (born 2 October 1948) is a male British former swimmer. Roberts competed in three events at the 1968 Summer Olympics. At the ASA National British Championships he won the 110 yards breaststroke title in 1966 and 1967 and the 220 yards breaststroke title in 1967.

References

1948 births
Living people
British male swimmers
Olympic swimmers of Great Britain
Swimmers at the 1968 Summer Olympics
Sportspeople from London
Male breaststroke swimmers